Mary Innes-Ker, Duchess of Roxburghe ( Goelet; October 6, 1878 – April 26, 1937) was an American-born heiress and socialite who married into Scottish nobility.

Early life
Mary Goelet was born in 1878. Her parents were Mary Wilson Goelet (1855–1929) and Ogden Goelet (1851–1897), a prominent heir and landlord in New York City and great-grandson of Peter Goelet, heir to one of the largest fortunes of the time. Her only sibling was a younger brother, Robert, who built Glenmere mansion.

Through her mother, she was a niece of Richard Thornton Wilson, Jr. and Grace Graham Wilson Vanderbilt and Cornelius Vanderbilt III. Through her father, she was a niece of Robert Goelet, a first cousin of Robert Walton Goelet, and a granddaughter of Robert Goelet Sr., a co-founder of the Chemical Bank of New York.

Personal life
In 1897, she was rumored to be engaged to William Montagu (1877–1947), the 20-year-old 9th Duke of Manchester. He later married a different American, Helena Zimmerman, daughter of industrialist Eugene Zimmerman of Cincinnati, Ohio, in 1900.

In the late December 1898, she was rumored once more to be engaged to Viscount Crichton (1872–1914), eldest son and heir of the 4th Earl Erne.

On November 10, 1903, she married Henry Innes-Ker, 8th Duke of Roxburghe (1876–1932). He was the son of James Henry Robert Innes-Ker, 7th Duke of Roxburghe and Lady Anne Emily Spencer-Churchill, the fourth daughter of John Spencer-Churchill, 7th Duke of Marlborough, who served in Conservative governments as Lord President of the Council and Lord Lieutenant of Ireland, and his wife, Lady Frances Vane, daughter of the 3rd Marquess of Londonderry. His first cousin was Winston Churchill. His younger brother, Lord Robert Edward Innes-Ker married the actress Jose Collins in 1920. After ten years of childlessness, Mary gave birth to a son and heir:

 George Innes-Ker, 9th Duke of Roxburghe (1913–1974), who succeeded his father in 1932.

The Duchess of Roxburghe died on April 26, 1937 in London.

Life in Scotland

The 8th Duke and Duchess of Roxburgh settled at Floors Castle, where Mary decorated the fortress with her own collection of art including a priceless series of 17th century Gobelins Manufactory tapestries. 

At the time of her marriage to the Duke of Roxburghe, she was the wealthiest American heiress, with a dowry of twenty million dollars, exceeded only by Consuelo Vanderbilt in the wealth brought to the transatlantic marriages of the pre-1914 era (see Gilded Age).

In 1913, she first became a guest of Queen Mary and King George at Windsor Castle. She and the Duke were also the guests of King Edward VII and Queen Alexandra.

In 1929, she inherited $3,000,000 from her mother's estate after the death of her mother, as well as the Goelet art collection.

See also
Duke of Roxburghe

References

1878 births
1937 deaths
Goelet family
Roxburghe
American emigrants to Scotland
Wives of knights